Martin Luther Davey (July 25, 1884March 31, 1946) was an American Democratic politician from Ohio. He was the 53rd governor of Ohio.

Childhood
Davey was born in Kent, Ohio in 1884. His father was John Davey, better known as the tree doctor and founder of the Davey Tree Expert Company. His mother was Bertha Reeves, the daughter of a minister. Martin was one of seven children. His sister Mary and another sibling died before reaching maturity. His surviving siblings were Belle, Wellington, James (Jim), and Paul.

Their family struggled with money, leading the young Martin to start making and selling his own horseradish as a child. All of the profits from this went to help his family. He also helped with his fathers farm and greenhouse. He was an excellent salesman, developing friendships with his customers.

He attended a country fair where he heard the famous "Cross of Gold" speech given by William Jennings Bryan. This led to him wanting to be a politician.

Education
Davey graduated from Kent High School in Kent, Ohio. After graduating high school, he worked for a time for the Oliver Typewriter Company in Cleveland, Ohio. He made $10.00 a week plus commission. He was an excellent salesman, and soon earned $200.00 a month. He decided to continue his education and attended Oberlin College, where he played football and was on the track team. He was third in his class, when he stopped his education to help found the family business. He returned to school for a time, until he met and married his wife. The marriage and birth of their first child ended his school career.

Political career
Davey was elected mayor of Kent, serving from 1913 to 1918. In 1918, he was elected to the United States House of Representatives to fill the term of Elsworth R. Bathrick. He was re-elected in November, but lost another bid for re-election in 1920. He was re-elected in 1922, 1924 and 1926. In 1928, Davey ran for governor, but was defeated. He ran again in 1934, and won two two-year terms before being defeated in a bid for renomination in 1938 by Charles W. Sawyer. He was the Democratic nominee for governor in 1940, but lost to incumbent Gov. John Bricker.

Family
In 1907 Martin married Berenice Chrisman of Kent.  They had three children: Evangeline, Mary Bernice, and Martin Luther Jr.

Mary Bernice died in childhood. Evangeline married Alexander M. Smith. Martin L. Jr. went on to work at the family business.

Legacy
Davey's family was known for their company, The Davey Tree Expert Company (founded 1880), located in Kent, Ohio.

The Davey Beef Building (erected in 1977 but no longer standing) at the Ohio Expo Center and State Fair in Columbus, Ohio, was named in honor of Davey.

See also
 Election Results, U.S. Representative from Ohio, 14th District
 Election Results, Ohio Governor
 Election Results, Ohio Governor (Democratic Primaries)

References

External links
 

Democratic Party governors of Ohio
Oberlin College alumni
1884 births
1946 deaths
American Disciples of Christ
Democratic Party members of the United States House of Representatives from Ohio
People from Kent, Ohio
Mayors of places in Ohio
20th-century American politicians